Brandish may refer to:

 Brandish (series), a four-game action role-playing video game series 
 Brandish (video game), a 1991 action role-playing video game and the first video game in the Brandish series
 Brandish Corner, a point on the TT Course, on the A18 road in the Isle of Man
 Mowtowr-e Reza Brandish, a village in Qaleh Rural District, Iran
 Brandish Street, a hamlet in Selworthy, England
 Myra Brandish, a recurring character in The Venture Bros.

Brandishing may refer to:
 Brandishing or brattishing, decorative cresting in architecture
 Brandishing or menacing, a type of violent crime in American criminal law